(दक्षिण), Sanskrit for "right-hand side", may refer to:
 Dakṣiṇā, the recompense paid to a priest for a sacrifice
 Dakshina, literally  "south", a Tantric concept right-hand path
 Deccan Plateau (via Prakrit dakkhin)
 South India